Terri Carver is a former state representative from Colorado Springs, Colorado. A Republican, Carver represented Colorado House of Representatives District 20, which encompassed several communities in El Paso County, including Air Force Academy, Cascade, Chipita Park, Colorado Springs, Green Mountain Falls, and Palmer Lake. She was first elected in 2014.

Career
In 1986, Carver was a Judge Advocate General (JAG) corps for the U.S. Air Force Reserve until 2014. In 1994, Carver became a civilian lawyer for the Air Force Space Command until 2008.

Awards 
 2018 Legislator of the Year Award. Presented by Colorado Association of REALTORS.
 2019 Elected Women of Excellence Award. Presented by National Foundation for Women Legislators.

References

External links
 Terri Carver at ballotpedia.org
 Terri Carver at colorado.gov
 Campaign website

21st-century American politicians
Living people
Republican Party members of the Colorado House of Representatives
Politicians from Colorado Springs, Colorado
Colorado lawyers
Carver
21st-century American women politicians
Year of birth missing (living people)